Qarchak County is in Tehran province, Iran. The capital of the county is the city of Qarchak. At the 2006 census, the region's population (as Qarchak District of Varamin County) was 211,949 in 51,400 households. The following census in 2011 counted 230,262 people in 62,905 households. At the 2016 census, the county's population was 269,138 in 79,853 households, by which time the district had been separated from the county to become Qarchak County.

Administrative divisions

The population history and structural changes of Qarchak County's administrative divisions over three consecutive censuses are shown in the following table. The latest census shows one district, two rural districts, and one city.

References

 

Counties of Tehran Province